A spherical angle is a particular dihedral angle; it is the angle between two intersecting arcs of great circles on a sphere.  It is measured by the angle between the planes containing the arcs (which naturally also contain the centre of the sphere).

See also
Spherical coordinate system
Spherical trigonometry
Transcendent angle

References

Spherical trigonometry
Angle